Reginald William Groth (1 February 1914 – 20 March 1994) was an Australian politician who represented the South Australian House of Assembly seat of Salisbury from 1970 to 1979 for the Labor Party.

References

 

1914 births
1994 deaths
Members of the South Australian House of Assembly
Australian Labor Party members of the Parliament of South Australia
20th-century Australian politicians